The New South Wales Under-20's rugby league team, also known as New South Wales Under-20s or New South Wales U20, represents New South Wales in the sport of rugby league at an under-20 age level. Since 2012, the team has played an annual fixture against the Queensland Under-20s team for the Darren Lockyer Shield. The team features players selected from the National Rugby League (NRL), Holden Cup, Jersey Flegg Cup and Intrust Super Premiership competitions. They are administered by the New South Wales Rugby League.

History 
Prior to the advent of the National Youth Competition, junior interstate matches were contested at under-17 and under-19 levels. In 2008, the age levels switched to an under-16 and under-18 format but no under-20 game was held until 2012. In March 2012, the first under-20 Origin match was announced by the National Rugby League. The NRL had been looking into running the match for more than 18 months.

From 2012 to 2014, the under-20 Origin fixture was held in April, on the Representative Weekend. In 2015, the game was moved to July as a curtain-raiser to State of Origin. As of 2017, the New South Wales under-20 team have for every fixture, winning six consecutive games since 2012. In 2018, they recorded their first lose, losing to Queensland 30–12 at Suncorp Stadium.

Players 
Players selected for the New South Wales under-20 team are under contract with a National Rugby League (NRL) side and play in either the NRL, Holden Cup, Jersey Flegg Cup or Intrust Super Premiership competitions. Since 2013, the NSWRL's selected a pre-season under-20 squad featuring players in contention for the mid-season fixture.

Results

2012

2013 
Played as a curtain raiser to the Samoa-Tonga Pacific Rugby League test match.

2014 
Played as a curtain raiser to the Samoa-Fiji Pacific Rugby League test match.

2015 
Played as a curtain raiser to Game III of the 2015 State of Origin series.

2016 
Played as a curtain raiser to Game III of the 2016 State of Origin series.

2017 
Played as a curtain raiser to Game I of the 2017 State of Origin series.

2018 
Played as a curtain raiser to Game III of the 2018 State of Origin series.

See also 

 New South Wales State team
 New South Wales Residents team
 New South Wales Women's team
New South Wales Under-18 team
New South Wales Under-16 team
 Junior Kangaroos team
 Jersey Flegg Cup
 New South Wales Rugby League
 Country Rugby League

References 

New South Wales rugby league team